Ilse Adriana Guerrero Rodarte (born 24 March 1993) is a Mexican racewalker. She competed in the women's 20 kilometres walk event at the 2019 World Athletics Championships held in Doha, Qatar. She finished in 37th place with a time of 1:46:32.

In 2019, she competed in the women's 20 kilometres walk event at the Pan American Games held in Lima, Peru. She finished in 4th place with a personal best of 1:30:54. As a result, she represented Mexico in the women's 20 kilometres walk at the 2020 Summer Olympics in Tokyo, Japan.

References

External links 
 

Living people
1993 births
Mexican female racewalkers
World Athletics Championships athletes for Mexico
Pan American Games competitors for Mexico
Athletes (track and field) at the 2019 Pan American Games
Athletes (track and field) at the 2020 Summer Olympics
Olympic athletes of Mexico
Sportspeople from Zacatecas
People from Guadalupe, Zacatecas
21st-century Mexican women